Sir Daniel McVey  (24 November 189224 December 1972) was a senior Australian public servant. He was Director-General of the Postmaster-General's Department from 1940 until December 1946.

Life and career
Daniel McVey was born in Carronshore, Stirlingshire, Scotland, on 24 November 1892, to Daniel and Jeanie McVey. He and his younger brothers Robert (Bob), Harry (Henry), George, Bill and sister Nessie moved to Australia in 1910 after their mother Jeanie died in childbirth and their father remarried.

McVey joined the Commonwealth Public Service in the Postmaster-General's Department as a clerk in 1914. He left the department to serve with the First Australian Imperial Force between 1915 and 1919 in the 45th Battery, attaining the position Lieutenant.

He was appointed Director-General of Posts and Telegraphs, heading the Postmaster-General's Department, in January 1940. From February 1944, McVey had also held the post of Director-General of Civil Aviation, head of the Department of Civil Aviation, a position he was officially "on loan" to.

McVey retired from the public service in June 1946. After leaving the service, he joined private industry, working as chairman and managing director of Standard Telephones & Cables Pty Ltd between 1946 and 1949, and then going on to become managing director of Metal Manufactures Ltd and Austral Bronze Co. Pty Ltd from 1949 until 1962.

McVey died on 24 December 1972 in East Melbourne and was cremated.

Awards
In 1946, McVey was awarded the University of Melbourne Kernot Memorial Medal, for distinguished engineering achievement.

McVey was appointed a Companion of the Order of St Michael and St George in 1950.

References

1892 births
1972 deaths
Australian public servants
Scottish emigrants to Australia
Australian Companions of the Order of St Michael and St George
People from Falkirk (council area)
20th-century Australian public servants
Australian military personnel of World War I
Military personnel from Melbourne